Rammeihippus is a genus of grasshoppers in the subfamily Gomphocerinae (unassigned to any tribe), erected by Woznessenskij in 1996 as a nomen novum. (The junior homonym Microhippus had been erected by Willy Ramme in 1939.)  there are two known species with a recorded distribution in the Balkans and Turkey (but this may be incomplete).

Species 
The Orthoptera Species File lists:
 Rammeihippus dinaricus (Götz, 1970)
 Rammeihippus turcicus (Ramme, 1939) - type species (as Microhippus turcicus Ramme)

References

Orthoptera genera
Orthoptera of Europe
Gomphocerinae